Auk/Blood is an album by Tanya Tagaq, released in 2008 by Ipecac Recordings.

Track listing
All tracks written by Tagaq.

 "Fox - Tiriganiak" – 3:45
 "Fire - Ikuma" – 5:07
 "Growth" – 5:27
 "Gentle" – 4:52
 "Tategak" – 5:41
 "Force" – 3:22
 "Growl" – 2:27
 "Want" – 3:11
 "Hunger" – 6:33
 "Burst" – 3:25
 "Blood - Auk" – 3:23
 "Construction" – 2:10
 "Sinialuk" – 2:50

See also
ᐃᑯᒪ, transliterates to "Ikuma" or "fire".

References 

2008 albums
Ipecac Recordings albums
Tanya Tagaq albums